Solano is an unclassified extinct language formerly spoken in northeast Mexico and perhaps also in the neighboring U.S. state of Texas.

Solano is known only from a 21-word vocabulary list that appears at the end of a 1703–1708 baptism book from the San Francisco Solano mission. Supposedly the language is of the Indians of this mission – perhaps the Terocodame band cluster. The Solano peoples are associated with the 18th-century missions near Eagle Pass, Texas.

See also
 Solano

Bibliography
 Campbell, Lyle. (1997). American Indian languages: The historical linguistics of Native America. New York: Oxford University Press. .
 Goddard, Ives (Ed.). (1996). Languages. Handbook of North American Indians (W. C. Sturtevant, General Ed.) (Vol. 17). Washington, D. C.: Smithsonian Institution. .
 Sturtevant, William C. (Ed.). (1978–present). Handbook of North American Indians (Vol. 1–20). Washington, D. C.: Smithsonian Institution. (Vols. 1–3, 16, 18–20 not yet published).

References

Unclassified languages of North America
Extinct languages of North America
Indigenous languages of Mexico
Indigenous languages of the Southwestern United States
Indigenous languages of the North American Southwest
Indigenous languages of Texas
Languages extinct in the 18th century